Vincent James Turner (born 9 October 1985), better known by his stage name Frankmusik (and between 2011 and 2012, by the name Vincent Did It), is an English synth-pop musician. Since 2010 he is based in Los Angeles as remixer and producer.

Early life
Vincent was born on 9 October 1985 in the Thornton Heath district of the London Borough of Croydon. He attended Christ's Hospital boarding school in West Sussex and was member of the house 'Maine A'. He entertained his housemates with constant piano playing. He completed a year-long foundation course at Central Saint Martins College of Art and Design and went on to study at the London College of Fashion, dropping out to concentrate on music.

Career

2007–2009: Frankisum EP and Complete Me
During 2004, Vincent performed as a beatboxer, under the name Mr Mouth.

Vincent released his debut EP, Frankisum, in 2007. Former school friend and then assistant of A&R at Island Records, Ben Scarr, introduced Island colleague Louis Bloom to Frankmusik's MySpace page, which was getting a significant number of hits at the time. Although already known for high energy electro and happy hardcore, Frankmusik's signing to Island was in part because Bloom recognised a pop star performer beneath the electronic music, telling HitQuarters: "Underneath all the madness there was some great hooks and melodies, and buried even deeper was a voice; it took a lot of time after signing for him to have the confidence to sing without putting loads of effects over his vocal."

In June 2008, Frankmusik remixed the second single by The Clik Clik Did You Wrong, which appeared on the B-side of the 7" single release.

In December 2008, Frankmusik made it on to the long-list of the BBC's Sound of 2009 poll. In the UK, Gaydar Radio was the first national station to champion Frankmusik and tracks from his debut album, Complete Me. Initially interviewed by Alex Baker as part of the station's coverage of National Student Pride, Frankmusik performed a number of live tracks, which were then playlisted as part of an album teaser. His rise to fame was also followed closely by his local radio station, 107.8 Radio Jackie, which was the first station to broadcast his music.

In January and February 2009, he was the support act for Keane on their Perfect Symmetry tour in the UK. In March 2009, he headlined National Student Pride in Brighton's seafront club Digital with Jodie Harsh and Dan Gillespie Sells (The Feeling). In June 2009, Frankmusik was support act for the Pet Shop Boys in London, Manchester and Liverpool. He did a short tour to launch the album Complete Me, starting in Brighton on 17 July and taking in London, Glasgow and Manchester.

Complete Me debuted on the UK Albums Chart at number thirteen in August 2009, after its second single, "Confusion Girl", was A-listed by BBC Radio 1 and reached number twenty-seven on the UK Singles Chart. The other singles were "Better Off as Two", which peaked at number twenty-six, and "3 Little Words".

In August 2009, a more extensive UK tour was announced to take place during November and December 2009. Just two days later on 20 August 2009, it was announced that Frankmusik would join the Perez Hilton Presents tour in Autumn 2009. Frankmusik was part of a line-up at The O2 Arena 3D ELEKTRO RAVE alongside Caspa and Rusko, Tinchy Stryder, High Contrast, and Dancing Robot Music.

During recording and promotion of his debut album, Frankmusik remixed material by other artists, including Pet Shop Boys' "Love etc.", Lady Gaga's "Eh Eh (Nothing Else I Can Say)", Alphabeat's "Fascination" and "10,000 Nights", Mika's "Relax, Take It Easy" and CSS's "Move", and has covered "Rehab" by Amy Winehouse and The Postal Service's "Such Great Heights". Frankmusik also co-produced "First Place" on Tinchy Stryder's 2009 album, Catch 22, and "Wish I Stayed" on Ellie Goulding's Lights (2010).

2010–2011: Moving to Los Angeles and  Do It in the AM
Early 2010,Turner decided to move from London to Los Angeles as his own producer. He had more time, more space and it was way cheaper than doing it in London.

He featured on a Far East Movement track called "Fighting for Air", from their album Free Wired; he also appeared in Far East Movement's music video for "Rocketeer" with Colette Carr and Mohombi. The same year he collaborated with Computer Club on a track called "Losing Streak".

It was announced in February 2011 that he has begun work producing the new Erasure album in Maine.  Entitled Tomorrow's World, this was released on 3 October 2011 in the UK, and 4 October 2011 in the USA. During October and November 2011 Frankmusik was the supporting act on the Erasure tour across the US and Europe.

In an April 2011 interview, his A&R Louis Bloom said that Frankmusik was at work on his upcoming album. According to Bloom: "The challenge has been for him to simplify the structure of his songwriting whilst still encouraging him into taking risks on the production duties." The album, Do It in the AM, was released in September 2011 and peaked at number 178 on the UK Albums Chart.

On 19 October 2011 Frankmusik announced via his official Twitter page that he had parted ways with his UK label, Island Records.

2012–2013: The SOPA Opera, Far from over, Between and Between us
In an interview with music blog Flop of the Pops on 3 January 2012, Frankmusik announced that he would change his stage name to Vincent Did It, along with the exclusive premiere of a song titled "Dynamo" part of the SOPA Opera EP.

On 10 March 2012 Turner announced on his Twitter page that he has decided once again to go by his former stage name, Frankmusik. He then released two new acoustic demos titled "I'll Know" and "This Is Who I Am" on his official SoundCloud account for Frankmusik. Throughout 2012 Turner released thirteen demos online.

On 31 October 2012 Turner released a single titled "Fast as I Can". The song was released independently through digital distribution company Tunecore for international release. The song was originally meant to be the lead single off of his then-titled album, You Are Here. Turner announced a track listing for the album and set a release date for 2013. The album was soon later scrapped, Turner claiming that he wanted to start fresh and not with "songs [he] wrote six months ago". On 14 February Turner released his sixth EP, titled, Far From Over. The EP consisted of four songs and was released for free through his website. The EP was not available for purchase, instead it was free but fans were asked to donate to JustGiving what they thought the EP was worth.

Shortly after the EP's release, Turner announced that his third studio album, Between, would be released on 1 April 2013. In March 2013, Turner announced that the album would no longer be released in April, along with revealing the cover art. The album's lead single "Chasing Shadows" was released on 9 May 2013 along with its video. On 11 May 2013 Turner announced that Between would be released on 7 June 2013.

On 10 September 2013, Turner released a full acoustic album called Between Us featuring 10 songs from Between as well as a new song called "Hymn" to coincide with Between.

2013–2015: By Nicole and For you
On 13 December 2013 Turner released a single, "Ephemeral Summer", on iTunes and its video two days later. In January 2014 Turner announced he was working on his new album, titled By Nicole, and announced its lead single, "Dear Nicole". "Dear Nicole" was released through Turner's YouTube account on 14 February 2014.

In February 2014 to coincide with the launch of Season six of RuPaul's Drag Race, RuPaul released his sixth studio album, Born Naked, including the track "Fly Tonight" featuring Frankmusik.

On 1 April 2014 the album's third overall single, "These Streets", was released accompanying its music video through Turner's YouTube account and was made available the following day on the iTunes store. Turner announced through his YouTube, Facebook and Twitter pages on 18 April that the album would be released on Monday, 28 April 2014.

The singer's fifth album was confirmed on 9 March 2015  via Twitter, Not Right Now. The first single, "This", was released on 4 May 2015.

On 13 August 2015 Turner announced a new album title "For You", along with the track listing and a release date for October 2015.

Frankmusik provided guest vocals for RuPaul's 2015 album Realness on the song "Die Tomorrow". This makes the second consecutive appearance of Frankmusik on a RuPaul album.

2016: Day Break, Night Shift and The Anya Hindmarch Fashion Shows
On 21 July 2016 Day Break was released as an eight track EP (Digital + Physical). A limited run of 500 copies will be made and the first 100 were numbered and signed by Frankmusik himself.

Night Shift EP followed in July 2017 including 7 remixes and the instrumental songs of Day Break.

During this year Turner started to write short synth instrumental pieces for Anya Hindmarch Fashion Shows in London. Referred to the names of the collection seasons SS16, AW16, SS17, AW17, SS18... His collaboration with her is still going on.

2017: SS17 & AW17 and instrumentals
SS17 is a six track EP that was released 17 June 2017 digitally. 

AW17 is an eight track EP and followed later in the fall of 2017. Instrumentals were released together for both in 2018 as an EP.

2020: Stephanie Clothing
On May 2020, Turner produced an instrumental Dance/Funk album under the new name of Stephanie Clothing. The album contains 9 tracks each one is illustrated by one colorful theme. The album is called 2020 Vision. The album was available in physical and Digital copies.

2021: Monthly Release, Carissimi and Kaushik Velendra fashion project
Starting January 2021, Turner was involved into a new project releasing a digital new single the last day of every month. Preparing the new album compiling all the singles at the end of the year. On 8 November, Turner surprised his fans by releasing the physical studio album titled Carissimi, two months before the end of the monthly releases. On 31 December Turner released another single "Next" and the album instrumentals.

This year Turner collaborated with Kaushik Velendra for the SS22 and AW22 LFW Fashion Collections by writing short instrumental pieces.

2022: Reworking first album - Completed and Previous works releases
Turner is having a new year of release surprisingly making reworks from scratch of his first album Complete Me that was not under his own label. The circle of releasing the last day of each month goes on. The first track in album release is "In Step". It includes two new remastered songs. The album was released at the end of the year with physical and digital releases. The album is called "Completed".

In parallel two of his previous works were published at the end of 2022. An EP with the songs of Anya Hindmarch Fashion Shows through the years 2016, 2017 and 2018.

And some very old demos he made for the background music for a now defunct website calledThe Heaths of Thornton. He said "The EP was  a random selection of tracks made after I just left high school and after dropping out of college (LCF). Some tracks were very rough. While others were modified professional demos to fit the vibe of the piece of music. For this release I decided to go in and create the correct splice points for each track in the mix and make it a more consumable piece of work instead of releasing it as a non stop 45 track. Although the last track is in fact the continuous work unedited."

2023: New album with fortnight releases
Turner is surprising his fans. He is actually releasing one new song every 15 days. January singles are called "White Branco" and "I can't". This project should lead to one massive album at the end of 2023.

For the London Fashion Week in february Turner is returning to instrumental music production for Fashion designer Kaushik Velendra Collections AW23.

Artistry
Frankmusik cites Daft Punk, Erasure, Electric Light Orchestra, Razorlight, Hard-fi, Pet Shop Boys, Late Of The Pier, Oasis and Killa Kela as influences.

In popular culture
Frankmusik appeared naked in the British gay lifestyle magazine AXM in 2009.
A lyrical reference is made to Frankmusik in the Colette Carr song "(We Do It) Primo". A drawing of Frankmusik and his Logo are also displayed on a screen behind Colette Carr when the reference is made. He also produced and co-wrote the track.

Discography

Albums

EPs
 Frankisum (2007)
 Vincent Did It (The SOPA Opera) (2012)
 Far+from+Over (2013)
 The Moongazer EP (2014)
 Day Break (2016)
 Nightshift (remix album) (2017)
 SS17 (2017)
 AW17 (2017)
 The Anya Hindmarch Fashion Shows  (11/2022)
 The Heath of Thornton (2003-2007 Demos) (11/2022)

Singles

Songs collaborations

Songwriting and production credits

Remixes
Amy Winehouse – "Rehab" (2007)
Chromeo – "Needy Girl" (2007)
Dead Disco – "You're Out" (2007)
Mika – "Relax, Take It Easy" (2007)
Remi Nicole – "Rock N Roll" (2007)
I Was a Cub Scout – "Out Smallest Adventures" (2007)
Alphabeat – "Fascination" (2007)
The Clik Clik – "Did You Wrong" (2008)
Alphabeat – "10,000 Nights" (2008)
CSS – "Move" (2008)
Daft Punk – "Digital Love"  (2008)
 David Swinburn – "Wrong Shoes (Frankmusik Remix)" (2008)
Keane – "Perfect Symmetry" (2008)
Go:Audio – "Made Up Stories" (2008)
Telepathe – "Chrome's On It" (2008)
The Black Ghosts – "I Want Nothing" (2008)
Erasure – "Phantom Bride" (2009)
Lady Gaga – "Eh, Eh (Nothing Else I Can Say)" (2009)
Pet Shop Boys – "Love Etc." (2009)
Space Cowboy – "Falling Down" (2009)
Nelly Furtado – "Night Is Young" (2010)
Natalia Kills – "Zombie" (2010)
Tata Young – "Mission Is You" (2010)
Erasure – "When I Start To (Break It All Down)" (2011)
Nicole Scherzinger – "Right There" (2011)
Natalia Kills – "Mirrors" (2011)
Far East Movement – "Rocketeer" (2011)
Killian Wells – "STRFKR" (2012)
Simon Curtis – "Flesh" (2012)
Alphabeat – "Love Sea" (2012)
Ride the Universe – "A Little Better" (2012)
Buffetlibre – "Fade Into You" (2013)
Empire of the Sun – "Walking on a Dream" (2013)
 Ride the Universe – "You And I" (2013)
 FrankJavCee – "So Damn Beautiful" (2016)

References

External links
 Frankmusik on SoundCloud

1985 births
Living people
Alumni of Central Saint Martins
Alumni of the London College of Fashion
British beatboxers
People educated at Christ's Hospital
English dance musicians
English electronic musicians
English keyboardists
English pop singers
English record producers
English male singer-songwriters
Interscope Records artists
People from Thornton Heath
Remixers
Singers from London
Synth-pop singers
Wonky pop musicians
21st-century English singers
21st-century British male singers